Cottus haemusi is a species of freshwater ray-finned fish belonging to the family Cottidae, the typical sculpins. It is  found in Bulgaria. It reaches a maximum length of 10.0 cm.

References

Cottus (fish)
Endemic fauna of Bulgaria
Cyprinid fish of Europe
Fish described in 1986